The Harrison Formation is a geologic group in South Dakota and Nebraska. It preserves fossils from the Miocene.

See also

 List of fossiliferous stratigraphic units in South Dakota
 Paleontology in South Dakota

References
 

Geology of South Dakota
Neogene geology of Nebraska
Neogene geology of Wyoming